Amedej Vetrih (born 16 September 1990) is a retired Slovenian footballer who played as a midfielder.

Club career
Vetrih was signed by Italian club Parma in a two-year deal in summer 2014 from Gorica. He immediately returned to Nova Gorica in a temporary deal.

On 25 June 2015, Vetrih became a free agent after the bankruptcy of Parma.

In summer 2015, Vetrih joined Domžale on a two-year deal.

References

External links
NZS profile 

1990 births
Living people
People from the City Municipality of Nova Gorica
Slovenian footballers
Association football midfielders
ND Gorica players
NK Brda players
Parma Calcio 1913 players
NK Domžale players
Çaykur Rizespor footballers
Gaziantep F.K. footballers
Slovenian PrvaLiga players
Süper Lig players
Slovenian expatriate footballers
Slovenian expatriate sportspeople in Italy
Expatriate footballers in Italy
Slovenian expatriate sportspeople in Turkey
Expatriate footballers in Turkey
Slovenia youth international footballers
Slovenia international footballers